Liverpool won the 2000–01 UEFA Cup with a golden goal in the final against Alavés for their third title in the competition. It completed a cup treble for the club, as they also won the FA Cup and the League Cup that season. The conclusion of the tournament by a golden goal is the only instance in any of the major European club cup competitions until the abolition of the rule in 2002.

Galatasaray could not defend their title as they automatically qualified for the 2000–01 UEFA Champions League and also reached the knockout stage.

English clubs had been banned from European competitions between 1985 and 1990 as a result of the Heysel disaster, and Liverpool were the first English side of the post-Heysel era to win the trophy. The previous English winners were Tottenham Hotspur in 1984. It was also Liverpool's first European trophy of the post-Heysel era.

Association team allocation
A total of 145 teams from 51 UEFA associations participated in the 2000–01 UEFA Cup. Associations are allocated places according to their 1999 UEFA league coefficient.

Below is the qualification scheme for the 2000–01 UEFA Cup:
Associations 1–6 each enter three teams
Associations 7–8 each enter four teams
Associations 9–15 each enter two teams
Associations 16–21 each enter three teams
Associations 22–49 each enter two teams, with the exception of Liechtenstein who enter one.
Associations 50-51 each enter one team
The top three associations of the 1999–2000 UEFA Fair Play ranking each gain an additional berth
16 teams eliminated from the 2000–01 UEFA Champions League are transferred to the UEFA Cup
8 teams eliminated from the group stage of the 2000–01 UEFA Champions League are transferred to the UEFA Cup
3 winners of the Intertoto Cup
The winner of the 1999-2000 UEFA Cup (not used due to Galatasaray's qualification to Champions League)

Association ranking

Notes
(FP): Additional fair play berth (Norway, Denmark, Scotland)
(UCL): Additional teams transferred from the UEFA Champions League
(IT): Additional teams from Intertoto Cup

Distribution

Redistribution rules
A UEFA Cup place is vacated when a team qualify for both the Champions League and the UEFA Cup, or qualify for the UEFA Cup by more than one method. When a place is vacated, it is redistributed within the national association by the following rules:<
 When the domestic cup winners (considered as the "highest-placed" qualifier within the national association) also qualify for the Champions League, their UEFA Cup place is vacated, and the remaining UEFA Cup qualifiers are moved up one place, with the final place (with the earliest starting round) taken by the domestic cup runners-up, provided they do not already qualify for the Champions League or the UEFA Cup. Otherwise, this place is taken by the highest-placed league finisher which do not qualify for the UEFA Cup yet.
 When the domestic cup winners also qualify for the UEFA Cup through league position, their place through the league position is vacated, and the UEFA Cup qualifiers which finish lower in the league are moved up one place, with the final place taken by the highest-placed league finisher which do not qualify for the UEFA Cup yet.
 A place vacated by the League Cup winners is taken by the highest-placed league finisher which do not qualify for the UEFA Cup yet.
 A Fair Play place is taken by the highest-ranked team in the domestic Fair Play table which do not qualify for the Champions League or UEFA Cup yet.

Teams
The labels in the parentheses show how each team qualified for the place of its starting round:
 CW: Cup winners
 CR: Cup runners-up
 LC: League Cup winners
 Nth: League position
 FP: Fair play
 IC: Intertoto Cup winners
 CL: Relegated from the Champions League
 GS: Third-placed teams from the group stage
 Q3: Losers from the third qualifying round

Qualifying round

|}

First round

|}

1 This match was played at Prater Stadium in Vienna instead of Red Star's home ground in Belgrade due to UEFA deciding to accommodate Leicester City's request in which the English club claimed that "travelling to FR Yugoslavia poses a security risk due to the political situation in the country". UEFA's decision was revealed on 12 September 2000—only nine days before the match's originally scheduled date (21 September 2000). The sudden decision to not only move the tie to a neutral location but to also postpone it for a week was a highly controversial precedent since no other club drawn to travel to FR Yugoslavia for matches in European competition that season received a similar advantage: Viljandi Tulevik, Sliema Wanderers, Dynamo Kyiv, Porto, OFI Crete, and Celta Vigo.

Second round 

|}

1 This 2nd leg match in Vigo actually ended with the score 5–3 for the hosts Celta, but was later officially recorded as 3–0 walkover since it was discovered that Red Star fielded two suspended players.

Third round

|}

Fourth round

|}

First leg

Second leg

Kaiserslautern won 1–0 on aggregate.

Celta Vigo won 2–1 on aggregate.

PSV 4–4 Parma on aggregate. PSV won on away goals rule.

Barcelona won 6–0 on aggregate.

Deportivo Alavés won 5–3 on aggregate.

Porto won 4–3 on aggregate.

Rayo Vallecano won 6–2 on aggregate.

 
Liverpool won 2–1 on aggregate.

Quarter-finals

|}

First leg

Second leg

Barcelona 4–4 Celta Vigo on aggregate. Barcelona won on away goals rule.

Liverpool won 2–0 on aggregate

Alavés won 4–2 on aggregate

Match interrupted for 16 minutes due to supporter disturbances.
Kaiserslautern won 2–0 on aggregate

Semi-finals

|}

First leg

Second leg

Alavés won 9–2 on aggregate.

Liverpool won 1–0 on aggregate.

Final

See also
2000–01 UEFA Champions League
2000 UEFA Intertoto Cup

References

External links

2000–01 All matches UEFA Cup – season at UEFA website
Official website
Results at Rec.Sport.Soccer Statistics Foundation
 All scorers 2000–01 UEFA Cup (excluding preliminary round) according to protocols UEFA + all scorers preliminary round
2000/01 UEFA Cup – results and line-ups (archive)

 
UEFA Cup seasons
UEFA Cup